Jonas Pinskus (born 22 September 1959) is a Lithuanian former rower who competed for the Soviet Union in the 1980 Summer Olympics.

At the 1980 Summer Olympics, he was a crew member of the Soviet boat that won the bronze medal in the eight event. At the 1986 World Rowing Championships in Nottingham, he won a silver medal with the eight.

References

1959 births
Living people
Lithuanian male rowers
Soviet male rowers
Olympic rowers of the Soviet Union
Rowers at the 1980 Summer Olympics
Olympic bronze medalists for the Soviet Union
Olympic medalists in rowing
Members of the Seimas
Medalists at the 1980 Summer Olympics
21st-century Lithuanian politicians
World Rowing Championships medalists for the Soviet Union